Henry Carey, 1st Baron Hunsdon KG PC (4 March 1526 – 23 July 1596), was an English nobleman and courtier. He was the patron of the Lord Chamberlain's Men, William Shakespeare's playing company. The son of Mary Boleyn, he was a cousin of Elizabeth I.

Early life
Henry Carey was the second child of William Carey and Mary Boleyn who was the sister of Anne Boleyn, the second wife and Queen of Henry VIII.  Carey and his elder sister Catherine came under the wardship of their maternal aunt Anne Boleyn, who was engaged to Henry VIII at the time. The children still had active contact with their mother, who remained on good terms with her sister, until Mary's secret elopement with a soldier, William Stafford (later Lord of Chebsey) in 1535.

Anne Boleyn acted as her nephew's patron and provided him with an excellent education in a prestigious Cistercian monastery. He was also tutored at some point by French poet Nicholas Bourbon, whose life had been saved from the French Inquisition after Queen Anne's intervention.

Henry's royal aunt was beheaded in May 1536, when he was ten years old. His mother died seven years later in 1543 on her estate in Essex. On 21 May 1545 he married Anne Morgan, daughter of Sir Thomas Morgan, of Arkestone, Herefordshire, and Elizabeth Whitney.

Royal appointments
Carey served twice as Member of Parliament, representing Buckingham during 1547–1550—entering when he was 21—and 1554–1555. He was knighted in November 1558 and created Baron by his first cousin Elizabeth I of England on 13 January 1559. His sister, Catherine, was one of Elizabeth's favourite ladies-in-waiting and the Queen was very generous to her Boleyn relatives. His Baronial estate consisted of the manors of Hunsdon and Eastwick, Hertfordshire and possessions in Kent. Hunsdon had previously belonged to Elizabeth's predecessor Mary I. He was also granted an annual pension of £400. On 31 October 1560 he was appointed master of the queen's hawks with a salary of £40 a year. On 20 April 1561, Henry also became a Knight of the Garter.

Elizabeth appointed Carey Captain of the Gentlemen Pensioners in 1564, a position making him effectively her personal bodyguard for four years. He accompanied her to Cambridge University in 1564, for which he was awarded an MA. On 25 August 1568, Henry was appointed Governor of Berwick-upon-Tweed, Northumberland.

Northern Rebellion
The year 1569 was the beginning of the Rising of the North (November 1569 - February 1570), a major uprising instigated by Thomas Howard, 4th Duke of Norfolk, Charles Neville, 6th Earl of Westmorland and Thomas Percy, 7th Earl of Northumberland. The rebellion was expecting the support of the Roman Catholic Pope Pius V.

Henry was appointed Lieutenant General of the forces loyal to the Queen. His February victory over Sir Leonard Dacre was instrumental in crushing the rebellion. Nearly three thousand rebels ambushed Henry Carey's party of half that size, but Carey was nonetheless victorious in fending off the assault. A number of the rebels crossed the border to Scotland but were there targeted by the forces of the Scottish Regent. Henry could still appreciate the courage of Dacre's soldiers. In his letter to the Queen detailing the victory, he made mention of the rebel charge "the bravest charge that ever I saw!". He was rewarded with a personal note of thanks from Queen Elizabeth I that read in part . .

The victorious Henry was appointed Warden of the Eastern March and represented the Queen in signing a treaty with the Regent on 23 October 1571. On 31 July 1574 Henry became Keeper of Somerset House, the property of the Queen before ascending the throne. He was then named a Privy Counsellor in 1577. On 16 January 1581, Henry was appointed Captain-General of the forces responsible for the safety of English borders. He was appointed Lord Chamberlain of the Household in July 1585 and would hold this position until his death. This did not prevent Elizabeth from appointing him Lord Chamberlain Lieutenant, Principal Captain and Governor of the army "for the defence and surety of our own Royal Person". The appointment occurred on 20 July 1588 in Tilbury.

Henry also served as Chief Justice in Eyre, south of the River Trent between 1589 and his death. He was Joined Commissioner of the Office Earl Marshal and High Steward of Ipswich and Doncaster. He served as Chief Justice of the Royal Forces between 20 December 1591 and his death. On 2 March 1592 Henry was appointed High Steward of Oxford for life.

Affair with Emilia Lanier
Beginning in 1587, Carey began an affair with Emilia Lanier (1569-1645), who was the daughter of a Venetian-born court musician, and she may have been covertly Jewish. Carey, 45 years older than Lanier, was Elizabeth's Lord Chamberlain at the time of their affair and a patron of the arts and theatre (he was the patron of Shakespeare's theatre company, known as the Lord Chamberlain's Men, but not until two years after their affair was over).

Records indicate that Carey gave her a pension of £40 a year. Lanier apparently enjoyed her time as Carey's mistress. An entry from Forman's diary reads "[Lanier] hath bin married 4 years/ The old Lord Chamberlain kept her longue She was maintained in great pomp... she hath 40£ a yere & was welthy to him that married her in monie & Jewells". In 1592, when she was 23, Lanier became pregnant with Carey's child. Carey paid her off with a sum of money and then married her off to her first cousin once removed, Alfonso Lanier, a Queen's musician. Church records show the two were married in St. Botolph's church, Aldgate, on 18 October 1592. Lanier gave birth to Carey's son, Henry, in 1593 (presumably named after his father).

Death
Henry Carey died at Somerset House, Strand on 23 July 1596 and was buried on 12 August 1596 at Westminster Abbey. On his deathbed his cousin Elizabeth I offered to create him Earl of Wiltshire; however, he refused, saying: 

Two of his sons, George, and John, successively followed him as Baron Hunsdon.

Relation to Henry VIII
Henry Carey's mother, Mary Boleyn, was mistress to King Henry VIII from 1520. The exact dates when the affair started and ended are unknown, although it is believed to have ended by the time Henry Carey was born on 4 March 1526.

Contemporary rumours stated that Henry was an illegitimate child of Henry VIII. Some 10 years after the child was born, John Hales, vicar of Isleworth, remarked that he had met a "young Master Carey," whom some monks believed to be the king's son. However, as Eric Ives has pointed out, the vicar was hostile towards the Boleyn family and may just have been causing trouble. The idea that Carey was Henry VIII's secret son has inspired modern historical fiction, such as the novel The Other Boleyn Girl. Alison Weir in her biography of Mary Boleyn concluded that the preponderance of evidence points to Henry Carey's sister, Catherine Carey, as being the only offspring of Mary's relations with Henry VIII.

Children
Henry Carey and Anne Morgan's marriage resulted in the birth of sixteen children.

Sir George Carey, 2nd Baron Hunsdon (1547 – 8 September 1603). He was married on 29 December 1574 to Elizabeth Spencer, daughter of Sir John Spencer, Member of Parliament representing Northamptonshire, and Katherine Kitson.
Sir John Carey, 3rd Baron Hunsdon (died April 1617). He was married on 20 December 1576 to Mary Hyde, daughter of Leonard Hyde of Throcking, Hertfordshire. They were parents of Henry Carey, 1st Earl of Dover.
Henry Carey. MP for Berwick and Buckingham.
Thomas Carey. Died in infancy.
Thomas Carey. Presumably named after deceased brother. Also died in childhood.
William Carey.
Sir Edmund Carey (ca. 1558–1637). He was married three times. First to Mary Crocker, second to Elizabeth Neville and third to Judith Humphrey. He was father to a younger Sir Robert Carey but it is not certain which wife gave birth to him.
Robert Carey, 1st Earl of Monmouth (1560 – 12 April 1639). He was married on 20 August 1593 to Elizabeth Trevannion, daughter of Sir Hugh Trevannion and Sybilla Morgan. They were parents to Henry Carey, 2nd Earl of Monmouth.
Joan Carey
Catherine Carey (ca. 1550 – 25 February 1603). She was wife to Charles Howard, 1st Earl of Nottingham.
Philadelphia Carey, who married to Thomas Scrope, 10th Baron Scrope and was mother to Emanuel Scrope, 1st Earl of Sunderland.
Margaret Carey. She was married to Sir Edward Hoby, son of Thomas Hoby and Elizabeth Cooke
Elizabeth Carey
Anne Carey
Eleanor Carey
Matilda Carey

In addition, Henry had several illegitimate children, including Valentine Carey, who became a clergyman, ultimately Bishop of Exeter.

Notes

References 
Weir, Alison. The Six Wives of Henry VIII. New York: Grove Weidenfeld, 1991. googlebooks. Retrieved 17 May 2009

Nicolas, Nicholas Harris. A Synopsis of the Peerage of England; Exhibiting, Under Alphabetical Arrangement, the Date of Creation, Descent and Present State of Every Title of Peerage Which Has Existed in This Country Since the Conquest. London: Printed by J. Nichols and Son, 1825. (p. 338) . Retrieved 25 June 2008

External links
A detailed history of the Northern Rebellion
A pedigree of him; not necessarily reliable

|-

|-

1526 births
1596 deaths
16th-century English nobility
Henry
English generals
Knights of the Garter
Members of the Privy Council of England
Lord-Lieutenants of Norfolk
Lord-Lieutenants of Suffolk
Carey, Henry
Burials at Westminster Abbey
Boleyn family
Illegitimate children of Henry VIII of England
Mary Boleyn
Barons Hunsdon